The Pierre Guillaumat was a supertanker built in 1977 by Chantiers de l'Atlantique at Saint-Nazaire for Compagnie Nationale de Navigation. It was the third vessel of Batillus class supertankers (the other three, slightly smaller, were Batillus, Bellamya and Prairial) and distinguished for being the biggest ship ever constructed (by gross tonnage). It was surpassed in length, deadweight tonnage and displacement only by Seawise Giant, which, though it was originally smaller when it was built in 1976, was subsequently lengthened and enlarged.

It was named after the French politician and founder of Elf Aquitaine oil industry Pierre Guillaumat and was completed in 1977. However, the poor state of the tanker market, accentuated by the huge dimensions of the ship that restricted where it could be employed, meant that the Pierre Guillaumat was unprofitable for most of its career and the vessel was laid up at Fujairah anchorage on February 2, 1983. Later that year, it was bought by the Hyundai Corporation and renamed Ulsan Master, she arrived at Ulsan, South Korea for demolition on 19 October 1983.

Its gigantic proportions left Pierre Guillaumat with very limited employment opportunities. The vessel could not pass through the Panama canal, and its draft meant it was only able to enter a small number of ports. It was therefore often moored at offshore rigs and oil terminals such as Antifer and, after lightering to reduce her draft, at Europoort.

Technical data
Length overall was 414.23 m, beam 63.05 m, draft 28.603 m, deadweight tonnage 555,051, and gross register tonnage 274,838. Propulsion was provided by two propellers each driven by two Stal-Laval steam turbines developing a total power of 65,000 Hp. The service speed was 16.7 knots, with fuel consumption of about 330 tonnes of heavy oil per day and fuel enough for 42 days.

The cargo was carried in 40 tanks with a total volume of 677,300 m3. They were divided into central and lateral tanks, whose dimensions were designed to reduce considerably the risk of pollution caused by collision or grounding. Ahead of the international standards of the time, the wing tanks had a maximum unit volume not exceeding 17,000 m3, which was reduced to 9,000 m3 in the most vulnerable parts of ship.

See also

Batillus class supertankers
Batillus
Bellamya
Prairial

References

External links
Gallery and technical information at aukevisser.nl

Ships built in France
1977 ships
Tankers of France
Oil tankers